The Gualeguay River (Spanish Río Gualeguay) is one of the major rivers of the Mesopotamic province of Entre Ríos, Argentina. It passes by the cities of Villaguay, Rosario del Tala, and Gualeguay, and finally empties into the Río Paraná Ibicuy, a distributary of the Paraná River in the Paraná Delta.

See also
 List of rivers of Argentina

References

 Turismo Entre Ríos. Geografía, relieve y límites de Entre Ríos.
 Secretaría de Minería de la Nación. Provincia de Entre Ríos - Recursos hídricos .
 CUENCAS HIDRICAS SUPERFICIALES DE LA REPUBLICA ARGENTINA .

Rivers of Argentina
Rivers of Entre Ríos Province
Tributaries of the Paraná River